Imre Tóth (born 3 November 1963) is a Hungarian water polo player. He competed at the 1988 Summer Olympics and the 1992 Summer Olympics.

See also
 List of World Aquatics Championships medalists in water polo

References

External links
 

1963 births
Living people
Hungarian male water polo players
Olympic water polo players of Hungary
Water polo players at the 1988 Summer Olympics
Water polo players at the 1992 Summer Olympics
Water polo players from Budapest
20th-century Hungarian people